Pierre Paul Cambon (20 January 1843 – 29 May 1924) was a French diplomat and brother to Jules Cambon.

Biography
Cambon was born and died in Paris. He was called to the Parisian bar, and became private secretary to Jules Ferry in the préfecture of the Seine. After ten years of administrative work in France as secretary of préfecture, and then as prefect successively of the départements of Aube (1872), Doubs (1876), Nord (1877–1882), he exchanged into the diplomatic service, being nominated French minister plenipotentiary at Tunis, fulfilling two terms as Resident-General.

In 1886 Cambon became French ambassador to Madrid; was transferred to Constantinople in 1890, and in 1898 to London, where he served until 1920.   In London, Cambon quickly became an important figure, helping to negotiate the Entente Cordiale between Britain and France in 1904, and serving as the French representative at the London Conference which resolved the Balkan Wars between 1912 and 1913.  Upon the outbreak of the First World War, Cambon helped secure British intervention on the French side. He was also the French signatory to the Sykes-Picot Agreement.

He was decorated with the Grand Cross of the Légion d'honneur, and became a member of the French Academy of Sciences.

In 2014, he was portrayed in the BBC docu-drama mini series "37 Days" by the French actor François-Éric Gendron. The mini series depicted behind closed doors story of the events which led to the start of the First World War.

See also
 French entry into World War I

References

External links

1843 births
1924 deaths
Politicians from Paris
Prefects of France
Prefects of Aube
Prefects of Doubs
Prefects of Nord (French department)
Ambassadors of France to Spain
Ambassadors of France to the Ottoman Empire
French residents-general in Tunisia
Ambassadors of France to the United Kingdom
Grand Croix of the Légion d'honneur
Honorary Knights Grand Cross of the Royal Victorian Order
19th-century French diplomats
20th-century French diplomats